The 2022 AFF Championship qualification tournament was the qualification process for the 2022 AFF Championship, the fourteenth edition of the AFF Championship. Brunei and Timor-Leste contested the tenth and lone remaining berth for the AFF Championship final tournament in two home-and-away matches. Brunei hosted both legs, due to Timor Leste not having a suitable venue.

Brunei secured qualification by defeating Timor-Leste 6–3 on aggregrate, making their second appearance in the final tournament after 26 years absence since its inaugural edition.

Venues

Qualification

Brunei won 6–3 on aggregate

Goalscorers
2 goals

  Abdul Azizi Ali Rahman
  Razimie Ramlli
  Mouzinho Barreto de Lima

1 goal

  Azwan Saleh
  Wafi Aminuddin
  Jhon Firth

References

2022 AFF Championship
Timor-Leste national football team matches
Brunei national football team matches
 November 2022 sports events in Asia
2022 in AFF football
2022 in Brunei football
2022 in Timor Leste football